Thomas Henry Bolt (March 31, 1916 – August 30, 2008) was an American professional golfer. He did not join the PGA Tour until he was in his thirties, but he went on to win 15 PGA Tour titles, including the 1958 U.S. Open. He played in the Ryder Cup in 1955 and 1957.

Early life
Bolt was born in Haworth, Oklahoma. He served in the United States Army during World War II and turned professional in 1946. He worked as a caddie and club professional in Shreveport, Louisiana.

Professional career
Bolt was the fifth PGA Tour player to shoot a round of 60 when he did it in the second round of the 1954 Insurance City Open at the par-71 Wethersfield Country Club, outside Hartford, Connecticut. Previously, Al Brosch, Wally Ulrich, Ted Kroll and Bill Nary had also scored 60. Bolt had 11 birdies in his round and had a putt for a 59, but missed a 15-foot putt for birdie on the 18th green. Bolt had scored 71 in his first round and followed with rounds of 69 and 71 over his final 36 holes. Bolt tied with Earl Stewart, but won an 18-hole playoff the following day.

Bolt was a member of the United States Ryder Cup teams in 1955 and 1957. In 1955, at Thunderbird Country Club in California, he won his two matches, including a singles victory over Christy O'Connor Snr. In the 1957 match at Lindrick Golf Club in England he won his foursomes match but lost to Eric Brown in the singles.

Bolt's fiery disposition earned him the nickname "Thunder" and "Terrible Tommy". He was known to break clubs during rounds, and his penchant for throwing clubs led to the adoption of a rule prohibiting such behavior. In his later years, he admitted that a lot of his on-course eruptions were merely showmanship and that he felt they had detracted from his playing.

Bolt was inducted into the World Golf Hall of Fame in 2002. He was also elected to the Arkansas Sports Hall of Fame, inducted in 2002.

Death
Bolt died in Cherokee Village, Arkansas at the age of 92. He is interred at Evening Shade Cemetery in Evening Shade, Arkansas.

Professional wins (20)

PGA Tour wins (15)

PGA Tour playoff record (4–2)

Senior wins (5)
1969 PGA Seniors' Championship, World Senior Championship
1978 Australian Seniors Championship
1980 Liberty Mutual Legends of Golf (with Art Wall Jr.)
1995 Liberty Mutual Legends of Golf - Demaret Division (with Jack Fleck)

Sources:

Major championships

Wins (1)

Results timeline

Note: Bolt never played in The Open Championship.

WD = Withdrew
CUT = missed the half-way cut
R128, R64, R32, R16, QF, SF = Round in which player lost in PGA Championship match play
"T" indicates a tie for a place

Summary

Most consecutive cuts made – 10 (1953 PGA – 1956 PGA)
Longest streak of top-10s – 3 (twice)

U.S. national team appearances
Ryder Cup: 1955 (winners), 1957
Hopkins Trophy: 1953 (winners), 1956 (winners)
Lakes International Cup: 1954 (winners)

See also
List of golfers with most PGA Tour wins

References

External links

St. Petersburg Times feature

American male golfers
PGA Tour golfers
PGA Tour Champions golfers
Winners of men's major golf championships
Ryder Cup competitors for the United States
World Golf Hall of Fame inductees
Golfers from Oklahoma
United States Army personnel of World War II
People from McCurtain County, Oklahoma
1916 births
2008 deaths